The CIVO Stadium, formerly Stade des Jeunes, is a stadium located in Lilongwe, Malawi.  It has a seating capacity of 25,000 spectators.  It serves as the home of CIVO United of the Malawi Premier Division.  It is currently under a re-construction by the Chinese government.

References

Football venues in Malawi
Buildings and structures in Lilongwe